The Laminex Pocket Rocket is an American sailboat, that was designed by Gary Mull and first built in 1983. The design is out of production.

Production
The boat was built by Laminex Industries in the United States, starting in 1983. It was developed into the Rocket 22 in 2004.

Design
The Pocket Rocket is a small racing keelboat, built predominantly of fiberglass. It has a fractional sloop rig, a transom-mounted rudder and a fixed fin keel. It displaces  and carries  of ballast.

The boat has a PHRF racing average handicap of 174 with a high of 178 and low of 165.

See also
List of sailing boat types

References

External links
Photo of a Pocket Rocket

Keelboats
1980s sailboat type designs
Sailing yachts
Sailboat type designs by Gary Mull
Sailboat types built by Laminex Industries